Udaypur is a village in Kalna II block of Purba Bardhaman district in West Bengal state of India.

Geography
Behula River flows by the village. Most of the land surrounding the village are composed of rice fields. The majority of the village's residents are farmers and businessmen.

Demographics
As per the 2011 Census of India Udaypur had a total population of 811, of which 412 (51%) were males and 399 (49%) were females. Population below 6 years was 68. The total number of literates in Udaypur was 590 (79.41% of the population over 6 years).

Education
Udaypur has one primary school and one secondary school.

Culture
This village is home to a locally important festival called Ma Behular Jhapan.

References

Villages in Purba Bardhaman district